This is a list of listed buildings in the parish of Perth, Scotland.

List 
All entries, addresses and coordinates are based on data from Historic Scotland. This data falls under the Open Government Licence

|}

Key

Notes

References
Specific

General
Perth – Scottish-Places.info

Perth